Abraham Kobina Ackah is an Anglican bishop in Ghana: previously an Archdeacon,  he has been Bishop of Wiawso since 2006.

References

Anglican bishops of Wiawso
21st-century Anglican bishops in Ghana
Anglican archdeacons in Africa
Year of birth missing (living people)
Living people